Turbinoidea was a superfamily of small to large sea snails, marine gastropod mollusks in the clade Vetigastropoda (according to the taxonomy of the Gastropoda by Bouchet & Rocroi, 2005). But it has become an available name, because it is no longer used in the current taxonomy of gastropods sensu Williams et al. (2008).

Taxonomy

2005 taxonomy 
Turbinoidea belongs to clade Vetigastropoda according to the taxonomy of the Gastropoda by Bouchet & Rocroi, 2005).

This superfamily consisted of the three following families (according to the taxonomy of the Gastropoda by Bouchet & Rocroi, 2005):
 Turbinidae Rafinesque, 1815
 Liotiidae Gray, 1850
 Phasianellidae Swainson, 1840

2008 taxonomy 
According to Williams et al. (2008) the following moves were made:
 Turbinidae was moved to superfamily Trochoidea
 Liotiidae was moved to superfamily Trochoidea
 Phasianellidae was moved to newly created superfamily Phasianelloidea

References

External links 
 

Vetigastropoda
Obsolete gastropod taxa
Taxa named by Constantine Samuel Rafinesque